Portrait of Elizabeth Farren, Later Countess of Derby is an oil on canvas painting by Thomas Lawrence. Produced before 1791 and probably in 1790, it is now in the Metropolitan Museum of Art, in New York, to which it was donated by Edward S. Harkness in 1940. As its title suggests, its subject Elizabeth Farren married Edward Smith-Stanley, 12th Earl of Derby in 1797, seven years after the painting.

References

Paintings by Thomas Lawrence
Farren
Paintings in the collection of the Metropolitan Museum of Art
1790s paintings